The Varasiddhi Vinayakar Temple in Besant Nagar, Chennai, India is a Hindu temple, located near the beach in Besant Nagar. It is dedicated to the Hindu god Vinayaka or Ganesha. The temple participates in activities such as feeding the poor and holds poojas frequently.

The first Kumbabhishekam (consecration) of the temple after extension activity was held in April, 1979 before which the idol was being worshiped at a site opposite the present site of the temple, within the CPWD Quarters compound. In fact, in the sanctum sanctorum, we see the idol of Valampuri Varasiddhi Vinayakar with Consort Siddhi held at His left. Over this idol, we see a small Ganesh Idol. This was the original idol that was being worshipped at the original site. Subsequent developments took place rapidly, like, construction of an auditorium behind the praharam on the eastern side and Goshala. The Temple conducts music program during Vinayakar Chathurthi time in this auditorium, which is also permitted for the conduct of musical/cultural programs by other organizations.

See also

 Religion in Chennai

External links
Website of the Varasiddhi Vinayakar Temple

Ganesha temples
Hindu temples in Chennai